José "Pepe" Villalonga Llorente (12 December 1919 – 7 August 1973) was a Spanish football manager during the 1950s and 1960s. He coached Real Madrid, Atlético Madrid, and the Spain national team, winning major trophies with all three.

Managerial career

Real Madrid

Villalonga was appointed manager of Real Madrid during the middle of the 1954–55 season and subsequently coached a team that included Alfredo Di Stéfano, Francisco Gento, Miguel Muñoz, Hector Rial and later, Raymond Kopa. During his first season they achieved a double, winning both La Liga and the Copa Latino. In 1956, Villalonga became the first manager to win the European Cup. At 36 years and 184 days at the time, he also remains to date the youngest manager to win the title. During his final season at Real he guided the team to a treble: La Liga/Copa Latina/European Cup.

Atlético Madrid

In 1959, Villalonga became manager at Atlético Madrid. With Villalonga in charge and with a team that included Enrique Collar, Miguel Jones and Adelardo, Atlético defeated Real in two successive Copa del Generalísimo finals in 1960 and 1961. They finished as runners-up in 1961 La Liga. In 1962, they won the European Cup Winners Cup, beating Fiorentina 3-0 after a replay.

Spain

In 1962, Villalonga was appointed manager of Spain. In 1964, the team won the European Championship title.  With a squad that included Luis Suárez, Francisco Gento, Josep Maria Fusté and José Ángel Iribar, Spain beat Romania, Northern Ireland and the Republic of Ireland in the qualifying rounds before hosting the semi-finals and final. In the semi-final, Spain beat Hungary 2–1. In the final, Spain successfully contested the USSR 2–1 in front of a crowd of 125,000 at the Bernabéu. Chus Pereda put Spain ahead after six minutes but a late Marcelino Martínez header was needed to win after Galimzian Khusainov equalised with a free-kick.

Villalonga took Spain to a less successful 1966 World Cup in England. Two consecutive defeats to Germany and Argentina after a 2–1 win over Switzerland left Spain and Villalonga to an early return home. The loss to Germany was his last of 22 games in charge of Spain.

Villalonga devoted his time to teaching at the technical level. In 1967, he was appointed director of the National Coaches School, a position he held until his death in 1973, and was the first Teacher of Football in the INEF Madrid.

He died in Madrid, as a result of a myocardial infarction on 7 August 1973, at the age of 53.

Managerial honours

Club

Real Madrid

 European Cup:
 1955–56, 1956–57
 Spanish Champions:
 1954–55, 1956–57
 Copa Latina:
 1955, 1957

Atlético Madrid

Copa del Generalísimo:
 1959–60, 1960–61
 Spanish Champions
 Runners-up 1960–61
UEFA Cup Winners' Cup:
 1961–62

International
Spain

European Champions:
 1964

External links
 La Liga stats
 Spain stats

1919 births
1973 deaths
Sportspeople from Córdoba, Spain
Spain national football team managers
Spanish football managers
Real Madrid CF managers
Atlético Madrid managers
La Liga managers
1964 European Nations' Cup managers
1966 FIFA World Cup managers
UEFA European Championship-winning managers
UEFA Champions League winning managers